Thomas Edward Mostyn Lloyd-Mostyn (23 January 1830 – 8 May 1861), was a British Liberal Party (UK) Member of Parliament (MP).

Lloyd-Mostyn was the eldest son and heir apparent of Edward Lloyd-Mostyn, 2nd Baron Mostyn. He was educated at Christ Church, Oxford. He was elected unopposed at a by-election in 1854 to succeed his father as Member of Parliament for Flintshire in 1854, a seat he held until his death in May 1861, aged only 31. His son Llewellyn succeeded in the barony in 1884.

He was also a first-class cricketer, for Oxford University and the Marylebone Cricket Club.

References

Kidd, Charles, Williamson, David (editors). Debrett's Peerage and Baronetage (1990 edition). New York: St Martin's Press, 1990.

External links 
 

1830 births
1861 deaths
Liberal Party (UK) MPs for Welsh constituencies
UK MPs 1852–1857
UK MPs 1857–1859
UK MPs 1859–1865
Welsh cricketers
Oxford University cricketers
Marylebone Cricket Club cricketers
Alumni of Christ Church, Oxford
Heirs apparent who never acceded
Eldest sons of British hereditary barons